Giovanni Roncon (2 January 1893 – 10 June 1963) was an Italian racing cyclist. He rode in the 1930 Tour de France.

References

External links
 

1893 births
1963 deaths
Italian male cyclists
Place of birth missing
Cyclists from the Province of Vicenza